William Charles Lachemann (born April 5, 1934 at Los Angeles) is an American professional baseball coach. He is the eldest brother of three siblings who have had long careers in the game:  Marcel and Rene have been players, managers and coaches in Major League Baseball and also remain active in the game. In 1995 and 1996, Bill Lachemann served as bullpen coach on the staff of his brother Marcel, then skipper of the Angels.

Bill Lachemann had a nine-season minor league catching career, interrupted by two years of military service, in the Brooklyn/Los Angeles Dodgers farm system. In his best season, 1960 with the Great Falls Dodgers of the Class C Pioneer League, Lachemann batted .307 and swatted a career-high 10 home runs. During his minor league career, Lachemann hit .253 with 30 homers. He stood 5'9" (1.8 m) tall, weighed 190 pounds (86 kg), batted left-handed and threw right-handed.

As a manager of Class A, Short Season A and Rookie-level teams in the farm systems of the Angels and San Francisco Giants for 14 seasons, Lachemann's teams compiled a 630–781 (.446) record.

References

External links
 Playing and managing career statistics, from Baseball Reference
 Coach's page from Retrosheet

1934 births
Living people
Bakersfield Indians players
Baseball coaches from California
Baseball players from Los Angeles
California Angels coaches
Fresno Giants players
Great Falls Electrics players
Kokomo Dodgers players
Los Angeles Angels coaches
Los Angeles Angels of Anaheim coaches
Major League Baseball bullpen coaches
Minor league baseball managers
Salem Dodgers players
Victoria Rosebuds players